Windy Hill may refer to:

Places
 Windy Hill, Essendon, an Australian rules football ground in the Melbourne area
 Windy Hill Wind Farm, a wind power station near Ravenshoe, Queensland, Australia
 Windy Hill (Pennines), a hill on the Pennines which marks the border between Greater Manchester and West Yorkshire, England
 Windy Hill, Kilmacolm, a house in Scotland
 Windy Hill, Renfrewshire, Scotland, a hill
 Windy Hill, Isle of Bute, Scotland
 Windy Hill Open Space Preserve, a regional park in the San Francisco Bay Area
 Windy Hills, Kentucky
 Windy Hill, a mountain in Madison County, Montana
 Windy Hill Beach, one of four communities merged to form North Myrtle Beach, South Carolina
 Constantine Sneed House, Williamson County, Tennessee, also known as "Windy Hill", on the U.S. National Register of Historic Places

Other uses
 The Windy Hill, a 1921 children's novel by Cornelia Meigs